The governor-general of the Baltic provinces or governor-general of Estonia, Livonia, and Courland was the military commander of the Riga Military District and the highest administrator of the Baltic governorates of Estonia, Livonia and Courland sporadically under Russian rule in the 19th century.

List of Russian governors-general of the Baltic provinces

Governors-general of Riga
 Anikita Repnin (1710–1726) appointed by Peter I of Russia
 Peter Lacy (1729-1740)

Governors-general of Livonia
  
 Vladimir Petrovich Dolgorukiy (1758–1761)
 George Browne (1762–1791)
 Nicholas Repnin (1792–1796) as the Governor-General of Livonia and Estonia

Governors-general of Livonia, Estonia and Courland in Riga
 Peter Ludwig von der Pahlen (1800–1801) Governor-General of Courland since 1795 
 Sergei Fyodorovich Golitsyn (ru) (1801–1803)
 Friedrich Wilhelm von Buxhoeveden (1803–1807), 
 Alexander Tormasov (1807)
 Friedrich Wilhelm von Buxhoeveden (1808–1810) as the Governor-General of Livonia and Courland
 Dmitry Ivanovich Lobanov-Rostovsky (1810–1812) 
 Filippo Paulucci (1812–1830) 
 Carl Magnus von der Pahlen (ru) (1830–1845)
 Yevgeny Golovin (1845–1848)
 Alexander Arkadyevich Suvorov (1848–1861)
 Wilhelm Heinrich von Lieven (ru) (1861–1864)
 Pyotr Andreyevich Shuvalov (1864–1866)  
 Johann Eduard von Baranoff (ru) (1866) 
 Peter Albedinskiy (ru) (1866–1870)
 Peter Bagrationi (1870–1876)

See also
 Governors-General of Swedish Livonia
 List of rulers of Estonia

References

Political history of Latvia
Political history of Estonia
Gubernatorial titles
19th century in Estonia
Baltic governorates